Sarah Perkins (born 26 July 1993) is an Australian rules footballer who plays for the Hawthorn Football Club in the AFL Women's competition. She previously played with the Adelaide Football Club, Melbourne Football Club, and Gold Coast Suns.

Early life and state league career
Raised in Melbourne, Perkins played netball and soccer before playing Australian rules football. At thirteen, Perkins was told she would no longer be able to play contact sports due to a spinal disc herniation, so she concentrated on netball for the next three years. However, she decided to start playing Australian rules football at sixteen, joining the Eastern Devils' youth side in 2009 and becoming a two-time Victorian under-18 representative before playing in the Devils' senior side in the Victorian Women's Football League (VWFL) in 2012. In 2016, she kicked fifty-two goals and finished third in the leading goalkicker award, behind Moana Hope and Katie Brennan, and was named in the VWFL team of the year. In the eighteen months before being recruited, she lost  to fulfill her dream of playing AFL football, reducing her BMI from 45.1 to just 31.7.

AFL Women's career

After being overlooked in the 2016 AFL Women's draft, Perkins was recruited by the Adelaide Football Club as a free-agent. Labelled as the league's first cult hero by the ABC, she recorded eight disposals, three marks and a long-range goal, and earned the nickname "Tex" after The Cruel Sea lead singer, Tex Perkins. In addition, her performance in the match drew comparisons to Adelaide captain and full-forward, Taylor Walker, who is also nicknamed "Tex".

She’s quick off the mark, uses her size to great effect, has a monstrous kick and loves a celebration" and the Australian edition of The Huffington Post said she is a player people need to know about and she is as strong as she is inspirational.

Perkins kicked four goals and created scoring opportunities for her teammates in the seventh round win against , leading to her being named Player of the Week by the AFL Players Association.

On 25 March 2017 Perkins and the Adelaide Crows defeated the Brisbane Lions at Metricon Stadium to become the inaugural AFLW premiers. Perkins played an instrumental role in the Crow's success, and was named on the forward line in the 2017 All-Australian team.

On 18 May 2017, Adelaide signed Perkins for the 2018 AFLW season.
In 2019, Sarah was delisted from Adelaide.
In 2020, Sarah was added as an injury replacement player to the Melbourne list.
In the 2020 AFLW Draft, Sarah was selected at  pick 23 to the Gold Coast Suns.

Statistics
Updated to the end of S7 (2022).

|-
| bgcolor=F0E68C| 2017# ||  || 28
| 8 || 11 || 8 || 43 || 24 || 67 || 18 || 24 || 21 || 1.4 || 1.0 || 5.4 || 3.0 || 8.4 || 2.3 || 3.0 || 2.6 || 6
|-
| 2018 ||  || 28
| 7 || 1 || 4 || 23 || 9 || 32 || 4 || 15 || 4 || 0.1 || 0.6 || 3.3 || 1.3 || 4.6 || 0.6 || 2.1 || 0.4 || 0
|-
| 2019 ||  || 28
| 2 || 1 || 1 || 6 || 3 || 9 || 3 || 5 || 1 || 0.5 || 0.5 || 3.0 || 1.5 || 4.5 || 1.5 || 2.5 || 0.5 || 0
|-
| 2020 ||  || 33
| 3 || 3 || 0 || 14 || 8 || 22 || 6 || 9 || 7 || 1.0 || 0.0 || 4.7 || 2.7 || 7.3 || 2.0 || 3.0 || 2.3 || 0
|-
| 2021 ||  || 28
| 5 || 3 || 0 || 29 || 3 || 32 || 9 || 5 || 12 || 0.6 || 0.0 || 5.8 || 0.6 || 6.4 || 1.8 || 1.0 || 2.4 || 0
|-
| 2022 ||  || 28
| 10 || 6 || 12 || 53 || 13 || 66 || 18 || 14 || 12 || 0.6 || 1.2 || 5.3 || 1.3 || 6.6 || 1.8 || 1.4 || 1.2 || 0
|-
| S7 (2022) ||  || 23
| 4 || 1 || 1 || 15 || 3 || 18 || 3 || 6 || 3 || 0.3 || 0.3 || 3.8 || 0.8 || 4.5 || 0.8 || 1.5 || 0.8 || 0
|- class="sortbottom"
! colspan=3| Career
! 39 !! 26 !! 26 !! 183 !! 63 !! 246 !! 61 !! 78 !! 60 !! 0.7 !! 0.7 !! 4.7 !! 1.6 !! 6.3 !! 1.6 !! 2.0 !! 1.5 !! 6
|}

Honours and achievements 
Team
 AFLW premiership player: 2017
 VFLW premiership player: 2018

Individual
 AFLW All-Australian team: 2017
 Adelaide leading goalkicker: 2017
 Gold Coast leading goalkicker: 2021
 Victoria Australian rules football team: 2017

References

External links 

Living people
1993 births
Adelaide Football Club (AFLW) players
Melbourne Football Club (AFLW) players
Australian rules footballers from Melbourne
Sportswomen from Victoria (Australia)
All-Australians (AFL Women's)
Victorian Women's Football League players
Gold Coast Football Club (AFLW) players
Hawthorn Football Club (AFLW) players